The 1914 United States Senate election in Pennsylvania was held on November 3, 1914. Incumbent Republican U.S. Senator Boies Penrose won re-election against Gifford Pinchot and A. Mitchell Palmer.

General election

Candidates
A. S. Landis (Industrialist)
Madison F. Larkin (Prohibition)
Alexander Mitchell Palmer, U.S. Representative from Stroudsburg (Democratic)
Boies Penrose, incumbent Senator since 1897 (Republican)
Gifford Pinchot, former Chief of the United States Forest Service (Progressive)
Frederick W. Whiteside (Socialist)

Results

References

Pennsylvania
1914
United States Senate